Erna Viitol (née Erna Juhanson; 10 May 1920 – 11 November 2001) was an Estonian sculptor.

Biography
Viitol was born into a family of farmers in Ala, Lõve Parish (now in Tõrva Parish), Valga County. She traveled to Stockholm, Sweden to study. Upon her return to Estonia in 1943, she studied in Tallinn at the Tallinn School of Applied and Fine Arts.

Works 
Viitol's sculptures, among others, included a bronze bust of female Estonian literary writer, Ellen Niit, and portraits of Heino Kiik, Lilli Promet, and Aino Kallas.

References

1920 births
1976 deaths
People from Tõrva Parish
Women sculptors
Estonian Academy of Arts alumni
20th-century Estonian sculptors
20th-century Estonian women artists
Soviet sculptors